Mount Blowaway is a gneissic mountain (1,320 m) with extensive areas of exposed rock, located 12 nautical miles (22 km) west-northwest of Governor Mountain in the Wilson Hills. So named by the northern party of the New Zealand Geological Survey Antarctic Expedition (NZGSAE), 1963–64, because three members of the party were forced by a blizzard to abandon their proposed survey and gravity station there.

Mountains of Oates Land